Leveillella is a genus of fungi in the Asterinaceae family. This is a monotypic genus, containing the single species Leveillella drimydis 

The genus name of Leveillella is in honour of Joseph-Henri Léveillé (1796–1870), who was a French physician and mycologist.

The genus was circumscribed by Ferdinand Theissen and Hans Sydow in Ann. Mycol. vol.13 on page 284 in 1915.

References

External links
Index Fungorum

Asterinaceae
Monotypic Dothideomycetes genera